is a Japanese actor who is best known for his roles in film and television, including the 2001 film All About Lily Chou-Chou. In 2009 he was voted one of Oricon's "fresh Stars" of the year. In 2009 he was also voted the 4th most attractive male celebrity in a swimsuit. In 2011 in a poll by NTT DoCoMo Ichihara was voted as having the 7th best abs based on 1,720 votes.

Filmography

Movies
 Ju-on 2 (2000) - Naoki
All About Lily Chou-Chou Riri Shushu no subete (2001) - Yuichi Hasumi
Yomigaeri (2002) - Katsunori Yamada
Onmyoji 2 (2003) - Susa
Worst by Chance (2003) - Hidenori Kaneshiro
T.R.Y. (2003)
The Angel's Egg (2006) - Ayuta Ipponyari
Rainbow Song (2006) - Tomoya Kishida
Check It Out, Yo! Chekeraccho!! (2006) - Toru Isaka
700 Days of Battle: Us vs. the Police (2008)
God's Puzzle (2008)
Negative Happy Chain Saw Edge(2008) - Yosuke Yamamoto
Rookies (2009)
Box! (2010)
Saru Lock The Movie (2010)
Dog x Police: The K-9 Force (2011) - Yusaku Hayakawa
Yakuza Apocalypse (2015)
Hoshigaoka Wonderland (2016)
Hotel Copain (2016)
Blade of the Immortal (2017) - Shira
The Blue Hearts (2017)
Samurai Sensei (2018) - Takechi Hanpeita
Ai Ai Gasa (2018)
Aircraft Carrier Ibuki (2019) - Yōhei Sakomizu
Sakura saku koro ni Kimi to (2019)
Katsu Fūtarō!! (2019) - Fūtarō
Three Nobunaga (2019) - Oda Nobunaga
School Meals Time Final Battle (2020) - Yukio Amarida
The Sun Stands Still (2021) - Ryūji Yamashita
A Family (2021)
Rika: Love Obsessed Psycho (2021)
Tom and Sawyer in the City (2021)
Red Shoes (2023)

Television series
Long Love Letter (Fuji TV / 2002)
Vitamin F (NHK / 2002)
Hitonatsu no Papa e (2003)
Drop-out Teacher Returns to School (TBS / 2003)
The Way I Live (Fuji TV / 2003)
Water Boys 2 (Fuji TV / 2004)
Waltz of Her Heart (NTV / 2004)
Aikurushii (2005)
Rookies (TBS / 2008)
Saru Lock (NTV / 2009)
Runaways: For Your Love (TBS / 2011) - Ataru Katsuragi
Hidamari no Ki (NHK / 2012)
Karamazov no kyodai (Fuji TV / 2013) - Isao Kuraosawa
Fukigen na Kajitsu (TV Asahi / 2016) - Michihiko Kudō
Kimi ni sasageru Emblem (Fuji TV / 2017)
Naotora: The Lady Warlord (NHK / 2017) - Ketsuzan
Riba-su (TBS / 2017) - Tanihara 
Chinmoku Hōtei (Wowow / 2017)
The Sun Stands Still: The Eclipse (Wowow / 2020) - Ryūji Yamashita
Isoroku Yamamoto in London (NHK / 2021) - Arata Oka
The 13 Lords of the Shogun (NHK / 2022) - Hatta Tomoie
Trade War (2023)

Book
2006 Personal Photo Book「ぴーす」
2009 写真集「HAYATO×JUNON LIFE」
2009 Photo&Word Book「HigH LifE」
2011 3rdフォトブック「VOLTAGE」
2015 「G 市原隼人」

References

External links
 

Japanese male film actors
Japanese male child actors
Japanese male television actors
1987 births
Living people
21st-century Japanese male actors
Stardust Promotion artists